Rudolf Christian Karl Diesel (18 March 1858 – 29 September 1913) was a German inventor and mechanical engineer who is famous for having invented the diesel engine, which burns diesel fuel; both are named after him.

Early life and education
Diesel was born at 38 Rue Notre Dame de Nazareth in Paris, France in 1858 the second of three children of Elise (née Strobel) and Theodor Diesel. His parents were Bavarian immigrants living in Paris. Theodor Diesel, a bookbinder by trade, left his home town of Augsburg, Bavaria, in 1848. He met his wife, a daughter of a Nuremberg merchant, in Paris in 1855 and became a leather goods manufacturer there.

Shortly after his birth, Diesel was given away to a Vincennes farmer family, where he spent his first nine months. When he was returned to his family, they moved into the flat 49 in the Rue de la Fontaine-au-Roi. At the time, the Diesel family suffered from financial difficulties, thus young Rudolf Diesel had to work in his father's workshop and deliver leather goods to customers using a barrow. He attended a Protestant-French school and soon became interested in social questions and technology. Being a very good student, 12-year-old Diesel received the Société pour l'Instruction Elémentaire bronze medal and had plans to enter Ecole Primaire Supérieure in 1870.

At the outbreak of the Franco-Prussian War the same year, his family was forced to leave, as were many other Germans. They settled in London, where Diesel attended an English-speaking school. Before the war's end, however, Diesel's mother sent 12-year-old Rudolf to Augsburg to live with his aunt and uncle, Barbara and Christoph Barnickel, to become fluent in German and to visit the Königliche Kreis-Gewerbeschule (Royal County Vocational College), where his uncle taught mathematics.

At the age of 14, Diesel wrote a letter to his parents saying that he wanted to become an engineer. After finishing his basic education at the top of his class in 1873, he enrolled at the newly founded Industrial School of Augsburg. Two years later, he received a merit scholarship from the Royal Bavarian Polytechnic of Munich, which he accepted against the wishes of his parents, who would rather have seen him start to work.

Career
One of Diesel's professors in Munich was Carl von Linde. Diesel was unable to graduate with his class in July 1879 because he fell ill with typhoid fever. While waiting for the next examination date, he gained practical engineering experience at the Sulzer Brothers Machine Works in Winterthur, Switzerland. Diesel graduated in January 1880 with highest academic honours and returned to Paris, where he assisted his former Munich professor, von Linde, with the design and construction of a modern refrigeration and ice plant. Diesel became the director of the plant one year later.

In 1883, Diesel married Martha Flasche, and continued to work for Linde, gaining numerous patents in both Germany and France.

In early 1890, Diesel moved to Berlin with his wife and children, Rudolf Jr, Heddy, and Eugen, to assume management of Linde's corporate research and development department and to join several other corporate boards there.  As he was not allowed to use for his own purposes the patents he developed while an employee of Linde's, he expanded beyond the field of refrigeration. He first worked with steam, his research into thermal efficiency and fuel efficiency leading him to build a steam engine using ammonia vapor. During tests, however, the engine exploded and almost killed him. His research into high-compression cylinder pressures tested the strength of iron and steel cylinder heads. One exploded during a test run. He spent many months in a hospital, followed by health and eyesight problems.

Ever since attending lectures of von Linde, Diesel worked on designing an internal combustion engine that could approach the maximum theoretical thermal efficiency of the Carnot cycle. In 1892, after working on this idea for several years, he considered his theory to be completed. In the same year, Diesel was given the German patent DRP 67207. In 1893, he published a treatise entitled Theory and Construction of a Rational Heat-engine to Replace the Steam Engine and The Combustion Engines Known Today, that he had been working on since early 1892. This treatise formed the basis for his work on and development of the diesel engine. By summer 1893, Diesel had realised that his initial theory was erroneous, leading him to file another patent application for the corrected theory in 1893.

Diesel understood thermodynamics and the theoretical and practical constraints on fuel efficiency. He knew that as much as 90% of the energy available in the fuel is wasted in a steam engine. His work in engine design was driven by the goal of much higher efficiency ratios. 
 
In his engine, fuel was injected at the end of the compression stroke and was ignited by the high temperature resulting from the compression. From 1893 to 1897, Heinrich von Buz, director of Maschinenfabrik Augsburg in Augsburg, gave Rudolf Diesel the opportunity to test and develop his ideas.

The first successful diesel engine Motor 250/400 was officially tested in 1897, and is now on display at the German Technical Museum in Munich.

Besides Germany, Diesel obtained patents for his design in other countries, including the United States.

He was inducted into the Automotive Hall of Fame in 1978.

Disappearance and death

On the evening of 29 September 1913, Diesel boarded the Great Eastern Railway steamer SS Dresden in Antwerp on his way to a meeting of the Consolidated Diesel Manufacturing company in London. He took dinner on board the ship and then retired to his cabin at about 10 p.m., leaving word to be called the next morning at 6:15 a.m.; but he was never seen alive again. In the morning his cabin was empty and his bed had not been slept in, although his nightshirt was neatly laid out and his watch had been left where it could be seen from the bed. His hat and neatly folded overcoat were discovered beneath the afterdeck railing.

Shortly after Diesel's disappearance, his wife Martha opened a bag that her husband had given to her just before his ill-fated voyage, with directions that it should not be opened until the following week. She discovered 20,000 German marks in cash (US$120,000 today) and financial statements indicating that their bank accounts were virtually empty. In a diary Diesel brought with him on the ship, for the date 29 September 1913, a cross was drawn, possibly indicating death. 

Ten days after he was last seen the crew of the Dutch pilot boat Coertsen came upon the corpse of a man floating in the Eastern Scheldt. The body was in such an advanced state of decomposition that it was unrecognisable, and they did not retain it aboard because of heavy weather. Instead, the crew retrieved personal items (pill case, wallet, I.D. card, pocketknife, eyeglass case) from the clothing of the dead man, and returned the body to the sea. On 13 October, these items were identified by Rudolf's son, Eugen Diesel, as belonging to his father.

There are various theories to explain Diesel's death. Some people, such as his biographers Grosser (1978) and Sittauer (1978) argue that Rudolf Diesel committed suicide. Another line of thought suggests that he was murdered, given his refusal to grant the German forces the exclusive rights to using his invention; indeed, Diesel had boarded the SS Dresden with the intent of meeting with representatives of the British Royal Navy to discuss the possibility of powering British submarines by diesel engine;. But evidence is limited for all explanations, and his disappearance and death remain unsolved.

In 1950, Magokichi Yamaoka, the founder of Yanmar, the diesel engine manufacturer in Japan, visited West Germany and learned that there was no tomb or monument for Diesel. Yamaoka and people associated with Diesel began to make preparations to honour him. In 1957, on the occasion of the 100th anniversary of Diesel's birth and the 60th anniversary of the diesel engine development, Yamaoka donated the Rudolf Diesel Memorial Garden (Rudolf-Diesel-Gedächtnishain) in Wittelsbacher Park in Augsburg, Bavaria, where Diesel had spent his childhood.

Legacy

After Diesel's death, his engine underwent much development and became a very important replacement for the steam piston engine in many applications. Because the diesel engine required a heavier, more robust construction than a gasoline engine, it saw limited use in aviation. However, the diesel engine became widespread in many other applications, such as stationary engines, agricultural machines and off-highway machinery in general, submarines, ships, and much later, locomotives, trucks, and in modern automobiles.

Diesel engines have the benefit of running more fuel-efficiently than any other internal combustion engines suited for motor vehicles, allowing more heat to be converted to mechanical work.

Diesel was interested in using coal dust or vegetable oil as fuel, and in fact, his engine was run on peanut oil. Although these fuels were not immediately popular, during 2008 rises in fuel prices, coupled with concerns about oil reserves, have led to the more widespread use of vegetable oil and biodiesel.

The primary fuel used in diesel engines is the eponymous diesel fuel, derived from the refinement of crude oil. Diesel is safer to store than gasoline, because its flash point is approximately  higher, and it will not explode.

Use of vegetable oils as diesel engine fuel
In a book titled Diesel Engines for Land and Marine Work, Diesel said that "In 1900 a small Diesel engine was exhibited by the Otto company which, on the suggestion of the French Government, was run on arachide [peanut] oil, and operated so well that very few people were aware of the fact. The motor was built for ordinary oils, and without any modification was run on vegetable oil.  I have recently repeated these experiments on a large scale with full success and entire confirmation of the results formerly obtained."

See also
History of the internal combustion engine
List of German inventors and discoverers
List of people who disappeared mysteriously at sea
List of unsolved deaths
Rudolf-Diesel-Medaille, German award in memory of Rudolf Diesel

References

Works
 Rudolf Diesel: Theorie und Konstruktion eines rationellen Wärmemotors zum Ersatz der Dampfmaschine und der heute bekannten Verbrennungsmotoren. Springer, Berlin, 1893, 
 Rudolf Diesel: Die Entstehung des Dieselmotors. Springer, Berlin 1913. 
 Rudolf Diesel: Solidarismus: Natürliche wirtschaftliche Erlösung des Menschen, Oldenbourg, Berlin/München 1903. (PDF)

Bibliography
 . (C. Lyle Cummins, Jr. was the son of Clessie Cummins, founder of the Cummins Company).

External links

 Rudolf Diesel at ThoughtCo
 Historical background of R Diesel mystery 
 
 
 
 

1858 births
1910s missing person cases
1913 deaths
19th-century German engineers
19th-century German inventors
20th-century German engineers
Businesspeople from Augsburg
German automotive pioneers
Engineers from Bavaria
Formerly missing people
Fluid dynamicists
People associated with the internal combustion engine
People who died at sea
Technical University of Munich alumni
Unsolved deaths